Rógvi Baldvinsson (born 6 December 1989) is a Faroese international footballer who plays as a defender for Bryne. Baldvinsson had a brief spell with Bristol Rovers in 2012.

Club career
He made his debut for the first team as 16-year-old in September 2006 for Norwegian side Ålgård FK. Baldvinsson began his senior career as a striker, but was switched to playing in central defence during his second season with the team. In the 2009/10 season, he was chosen as the new captain of the team. In July 2012 he signed for League Two side Bristol Rovers after being recommended to manager Mark McGhee by former Faroe Islands boss Brian Kerr. His time in Bristol was to last just over two weeks as Baldvinsson announced on his Twitter page that he was to return to Norway for personal reasons, where he rejoined Ålgård FK.

He played for Bryne FK in 2013, but in Ålgård again from 2014.

In 2015 he signed a contract with the Danish club FC Fredericia, who played in the second tier. The contract lasted for the second half of 2015. In 2016 he signed a contract with Norwegian club Vidar who played in the second division of Norway. In 2017 Baldvinsson is playing with Bryne again; the team was relegated from 1. divisjon to 2. divisjon after the 2016 season.

International career
Baldvinsson represented Faroe Islands at under-21 level. He was first called up to the Faroe Islands national football team in October 2010 and made his international debut in June 2011. Baldvinsson scored his first international goal in the 2014 World Cup qualifier against Sweden on 12 October 2012, when he sent his team up in a 1–0 lead in the eventual 1–2 loss.

International goals
Scores and results list Faroe Island's goal tally first.

Career statistics

Personal life 
Baldvinsson was born in the Faroe Islands. When he was five years old he moved to Norway with his parents.

References

Perch-Nielsen forlader FC Fredericia, bold.dk

External links
 
 

1989 births
Living people
People from Tórshavn
Faroese footballers
Faroe Islands international footballers
Faroese expatriate footballers
Expatriate footballers in Norway
Faroese expatriate sportspeople in Norway
Expatriate footballers in England
Faroese expatriate sportspeople in England
Ålgård FK players
Bristol Rovers F.C. players
Bryne FK players
FC Fredericia players
FK Vidar players
Norwegian Second Division players
Norwegian First Division players
Danish 1st Division players
Association football fullbacks